Seoul Foreign School is a Pre-K/Reception to Grade 12 international school located in Seoul, South Korea. The school was founded in 1912 by Christian missionaries to Korea and emphasizes Christian values. The Elementary, Middle and High Schools offer an international curriculum within the International Baccalaureate framework of PYP, MYP and DP.  The High School offers the IB Diploma Programme.  The British School offers the English National Curriculum - Key Stages 1–3. Seoul Foreign School has been located in Yeonhui-dong, Seodaemun-gu since 1959.

Seoul Foreign School is accredited by the Western Association of Schools and Colleges (WASC) and the (CIS)

History
Seoul Foreign School was founded in 1912, by Christian missionaries to Korea, with one class of 18 students.  Today it is one of the oldest international schools in the world, and the oldest British international school in Korea and the first in South Korea to offer the IB Diploma.

Divisions

British School
Principal: Andrew Freeman
Assistant Principal: John Kett

The British School (SFBS) offers a curriculum based around the English National Curriculum spanning from Reception to Year 9. It is a member of the Federation of British International Schools in Asia (FOBISIA) and students participate in sports, maths and other activities alongside other member schools. There are students from over 45 nationalities at the school.

Elementary School
Principal: Damian Prest
Assistant Principal: Margaret Park

The elementary school (SFES) offers an international curriculum based within the IB PYP framework. Grade levels include Pre-K to 5th grade. School uniforms were introduced to SFES in the school year 2008-2009. The Seoul Foreign Elementary School offers specialist classes for every student including Music, Korean, Information Technology, Library, Art, and PE. A new building was completed for the 2008-2009 school year and includes a new cafeteria, 400 seat performance hall, media center/library, upgraded classrooms, and a spirit store. In the fall of 2011, a 1-to-1 laptop program was instituted in the fourth and fifth grade.

Middle School
Principal: Justin Smith
Assistant Principal: Matthew Johnson

The Middle School is located in its own building built in 1988. There are five foreign language tracks offered: Spanish, French, Mandarin, Korean (for non-native speakers) and heritage Korean (for native Korean speakers). The music program is especially strong, with multiple levels of course offerings in choir, band and strings orchestra.  Every student also takes Christian Studies, an academic course that introduces students to the foundational ideas of the Christian faith from a non-denominational perspective. Students who are interested in exploring their faith on a personal level may participate in a vibrant after-school discipleship program.  All students take PE. The PE classes are unintegrated, meaning that boys and girls are separated. All SFMS students are able to participate in a variety of after-school sports.  SFMS belongs to the Korean American Interscholastic Activities Conference (KAIAC), allowing for competition and collaboration with other schools in sports and the arts.

High School
Principal: Nancy Le Nezet
Assistant Principal: Kelly Gilmore

The high school (SFHS) offers an international curriculum that is accredited by the Western Association of Schools and Colleges (WASC). The high school offers the International Baccalaureate (IB) Diploma. Graduates from Seoul Foreign School attend universities and colleges throughout the world.

Music program
All students from kindergarten through 8th grade/Year 9 take music classes. The school offers a band, choir and orchestra program as well as IB DP music.  The Middle School/KS3 have four bands: Beginner Band, Intermediate Band, Concert Band, and Symphonic Band.  Both the Middle School Symphonic Band and the High School Wind Ensemble have won numerous awards and acknowledgements in the field. The Middle School Symphonic Band won a platinum award [highest ranking award]  on a nationwide competition in 2015.

Performing arts facilities

The Lyso Center for Performing Arts was constructed in 2004.  It includes large rehearsal rooms for band, choir and orchestra, as well as ensemble and individual practice rooms.  There is also a keyboard/composition lab.  The main theater seats over 700 people, has a hydraulic orchestra pit, a turn table, and a removable large Wenger acoustical sell.  There is also a Black Box theater with flexible seating up to 200 people.  Robb Hall is a mid-size theater and has seating for 450 people.

Athletic facilities

Seoul Foreign School has an indoor sports complex which houses two gyms, each with several basketball courts, indoor volleyball courts, as well as one weight training/fitness room. Also, located outside are two more basketball courts (next to the soccer field). More basketball courts can also be found on the British school playground. There is an artificial turf football (soccer) field, a sandpit for long jump, and a running track. There is also an indoor pool with two tennis courts situated above it. Two more tennis courts are situated adjacent to the British school playground. There is also a gymnastics room for various uses ranging from acrobatics workout to ballet practice. An additional four tennis courts are located on the roof of the cafeteria.

Extracurricular activities

Seoul Foreign School supports a number of activities. At the HS level, an academic activity is the AMC (American Math Competition) competition with three levels of competition: 8th grade, 10th grade, and 12th grade. SFS High School has an active Model United Nations activity with weekly meetings and two meets annually (one in Seoul and the other in Beijing.)  A Speech and Debate team also represents SFS with forensic meets with local and area schools. There are a number of choral, instrumental (band, orchestra, and jazz band), drama, and musical productions throughout the years. High school students are also able to participate in Habitat for Humanity, both national and international builds, and the National Honor Society. As for sports, Seoul Foreign School is part of the Korean American Interscholastic Activities Conference (KAIAC) and the Asia Pacific Activities Conference (APAC). The fall sports for high school are tennis, volleyball, cross country. Cross country and volleyball both have Varsity and Junior Varsity teams for both genders, whereas there is only one co-ed Varsity team for tennis. Winter sports are basketball and cheerleading, both of which have Varsity as well as JV teams. Soccer and swimming are both spring sports, and they both have only Varsity teams.

SFS Middle School participates in an area Spelling Bee, KMO and other clubs. There are also sports and other after-school activities, such as the Jazz Band/Ensemble, chess club, instrumental private lessons. Film club is also a popular club that meets on Mondays to create films and at the end of the year, hosts a film festival with all of the profit going to GIN (Global Issues Network). Additional activities are sponsored by each division's "Senate", or Student Council. These activities include dances, swims and various other events throughout the school year. The Boys Varsity Soccer Team is known for their multiple wins in the two competitions the team participates in: KAIAC and APAC.

The 2010-2011 Girls Varsity Soccer Team of Seoul Foreign School won the All-Girls APAC Super Tournament hosted by Shanghai American School Pudong, beating 12 other teams, undefeated.

Christian emphasis

SFS seeks to model Christianity through the hiring of exceptional and experienced educators who are also practicing Christians.  The influence of Christianity originated in 1912 when missionaries first founded the school and continue today. The school is not affiliated with a particular denomination or church, nor are students required to come from religious backgrounds. Students from Grade 6-12 are required to take a mandatory Christian Studies course regardless of their religious backgrounds.

Notable alumni

Ken Jennings: holds the record for the longest winning streak in the U.S. syndicated game show Jeopardy!
Ien Chi: Korean American filmmaker, 2011 winner of the Best Director and Best Picture awards at the world's largest student film festival: Campus MovieFest
Yoon Ha Lee: American Science Fiction and fantasy writer.
Joseph Rhee: Producer for ABC News, 2019 Emmy recipient winner for News and Documentary.
James Rhee: Entrepreneur and Founder of Aero-K Airlines 
Esther Youngme Moon: Donald K. David Professor and Dean: Harvard Business School
Rachel Moon, MD: Leading authority on Sudden Infant Death Syndrome: (SIDS)
David Lim, MBA: CEO & Founder of SubScreener.com 
Justin Kim: CEO & Founder of Ami, Forbes 30 Under 30 2020: (FORBES)

References

External links
 Official website
 Official KAIAC website

International schools in Seoul
Cambridge schools in South Korea
International Baccalaureate schools in South Korea
Educational institutions established in 1912
British international schools in Asia
1912 establishments in Korea
American international schools in South Korea
Seodaemun District